Albert J. Beirens (May 1947 – 25 June 2020) was a Belgian radio producer and journalist.

Early life
Beirens was born in Bruges in May 1947.

Career
In the 1970s, Beirens was a radio producer with various pirate stations, including Radio North Sea International and Radio Atlantis, which were illegal radio stations that broadcast from a ship in the North Sea. For more than 30 years, he worked for the BBC and the VRT, the national Flemish broadcasting station, as a correspondent. He also worked for Radio Nova Italie, Radio Paradijs (Knokke-Heist), ORO Nieuwsdienst and VRT. He was a radio correspondent for Zeebrugge and Knokke-Heist. As a maritime journalist, AJ Beirens specialized in the port of Zeebrugge and the English Channel. He wrote several books including one about the refugee problems during World War II.

In May 2020, his health deteriorated. He opted for euthanasia and died on 25 June 2020 at age 73.

References

External links
 Biography and works

1947 births
2020 deaths
Belgian radio presenters
20th-century Belgian journalists
Male journalists
Writers from Bruges
Euthanasia in Belgium
21st-century Belgian journalists